Rocky Taylor (born Laurie Taylor; 28 February 1945) is an English stuntman and actor.

Career
His first appearance as a stuntman was an uncredited role in Dr. No. He has since been a stuntman for many famous and successful films including multiple James Bond and Indiana Jones films, A Bridge Too Far, Titanic, The Da Vinci Code, Harry Potter and the Deathly Hallows – Part 1 and the HBO television series Game of Thrones. He has also had minor acting roles in 40 films, including doubling for Roger Moore and Sean Connery in James Bond films. He is also known for playing the original Honey Monster in a series of commercials for Sugar Puffs.

Taylor currently holds the record for being the oldest stuntman in Britain, with 35 years as a stunt performer and 20 years as a stunt coordinator. He appeared on Russell Howard's Good News in 2011 to discuss his career.

Accidents
Taylor suffered a fractured spine in 1985 when a stunt on the film Death Wish 3 went wrong, but survived the fall from a burning building. He performed the stunt successfully 26 years later in 2011.

Personal life
Taylor was born in Bermondsey, South East London, England. His father Larry was also a stuntman, appearing in several films, including Zulu.

In April 2019, he released his official biography, Jump Rocky Jump, with Pegasus Elliot Mackenzie Publishers.

On 2 April 2020, Taylor was reported to be in "critical condition" after contracting COVID-19.

Selective filmography

References

External links
Official website

1945 births
Living people
People from Weybridge
English stunt performers
English male film actors
English male television actors
Male actors from Surrey